Melissa "Missy" Hughes serves as secretary and chief executive officer of the Wisconsin Economic Development Corporation. She was appointed in September 2019 by Gov. Tony Evers, and confirmed one month later. Hughes is the first woman to hold the post.

Background
Before joining WEDC, Hughes served as general counsel and chief mission officer at Organic Valley, a dairy cooperative in Wisconsin. Previously she was associate attorney at the law firm of Holland & Hart. She received her BA degree from Georgetown University and a law degree from the University of Wyoming.

See also
 Wisconsin Economic Development Corporation

External links
 WEDC.org

References

Government of Wisconsin
Living people
State cabinet secretaries of Wisconsin
Place of birth missing (living people)
Year of birth missing (living people)
University of Wyoming alumni
Georgetown University alumni